The 2000 Speedway Grand Prix of Poland was the third race of the 2000 Speedway Grand Prix season. It took place on 1 July at the Olympic Stadium in Wrocław, Poland.

Starting positions draw 

The Speedway Grand Prix Commission nominated two Poles Piotr Protasiewicz and Sebastian Ułamek as Wild Card.

Heat details

Standings

See also 
 Speedway Grand Prix
 List of Speedway Grand Prix riders

References

External links 
 FIM-live.com
 SpeedwayWorld.tv

P
2000
Speedway Grand Prix Of Poland, 2000
Sport in Wrocław